Thomas Browne, D.D. (b Norwich 1648 – d London 1706) was Master of Pembroke College, Cambridge  from 1694 until his death.

Browne entered Pembroke College, Cambridge in 1664. He graduated B.A. in 1668 and M.A. in 1671. He became a Fellow of Pembroke in 1671; was ordained in 1674; and appointed Junior Proctor in 1685.  He held the living at Orton Waterville from 1687 until his death. He was also Vice-Chancellor of the University of Cambridge from 1694 to 1695.

References

1648 births
1706 deaths
Academics from Norwich
Vice-Chancellors of the University of Cambridge
Alumni of Pembroke College, Cambridge
Masters of Pembroke College, Cambridge
Fellows of Pembroke College, Cambridge
17th-century English Anglican priests